Dean Josiah Cover, professionally known as Inflo, is an English record producer, songwriter, and multi-instrumentalist. He helms the R&B music collective project Sault, which foregrounds black-centric issues.

Career
In 2014, British rock band the Kooks worked with Inflo on their fourth studio album Listen after frontman Luke Pritchard discovered him via SoundCloud. Pritchard described Inflo as a "young Quincy Jones" as Pritchard applauded Inflo's bravery and conceptuality in his production. In 2016, Inflo worked with Max Jury, Michael Kiwanuka, and Tom Odell. In 2017, Inflo won the Best Song Musically and Lyrically at the Ivor Novello Awards for co-writing "Black Man in a White World", performed by Kiwanuka.

In 2020, Inflo received the Mercury Prize for his production work on Michael Kiwanuka's third studio album Kiwanuka. He also won the Best Album at the Ivor Novello Awards the same year for his work on the album Grey Area by Little Simz. In 2021, it was reported that he was working with Adele on her upcoming fourth studio album 30.

On 30 September 2021, Inflo was announced as the winner of the acclaimed MPG (Music Producers Guild) UK "Producer of the Year" award.

On 8 February 2022, Inflo was announced as the "Producer of the Year" at the 2022 Brit Awards, this was especially significant due to Inflo being the first black person to receive this honour since the inception of the Brits in 1977.

On 18 October 2022, Inflo was thanked by Little Simz for his production work on her album Sometimes I Might Be Introvert.

Discography

Singles
"No Fear" (2018)

Production discography

Albums
Listen by The Kooks (2014)
Love & Hate by Michael Kiwanuka (2016)
Winter Songs by Cleo Sol (2018)
For Ever by Jungle (2018)
Grey Area by Little Simz (2019)
Kiwanuka by Michael Kiwanuka (2019)
5 by Sault (2019)
7 by Sault (2019)
Untitled (Black Is) by Sault (2020)
Untitled (Rise) by Sault (2020)
Rose in the Dark by Cleo Sol (2020)
Nine by Sault (2021)
Mother by Cleo Sol (2021)
Sometimes I Might Be Introvert by Little Simz (2021)
30 by Adele (2021)
Air by Sault (2022)
10 by Sault (2022)
AIIR by Sault (2022)
Earth by Sault (2022)
Today & Tomorrow by Sault (2022)
11 by Sault (2022)
Untitled (God) by Sault (2022)
No Thank You by Little Simz (2022)

Tracks

References

English songwriters
Ivor Novello Award winners
English record producers
British hip hop record producers
Musicians from London
Black British musicians